Marlen Martynovich Khutsiev (4 October 1925 – 19 March 2019) was a Georgian-born Soviet and Russian filmmaker best known for his cult films from the 1960s, which include I Am Twenty and July Rain. He was named a People's Artist of the USSR in 1986.

Biography
Khutsiev's father, Martyn Levanovich Khutsishvili (the family's original Georgian surname), was a lifelong Communist who was purged in 1937. His mother, Nina Mikhailovna Utenelishvili was an actress. Khutsiev studied film in the directing department at the Gerasimov Institute of Cinematography (VGIK), graduating in 1952. He worked as a director at the Odessa film studio from 1952 to 1958, and worked full-time as a director at Mosfilm from 1965 onward.

Khutsiev's first feature film, Spring on Zarechnaya Street (1956), encapsulated the mood of the Khrushchev Thaw and went on to become one of the top box-office draws of the 1950s. Three years later, Khutsiev launched Vasily Shukshin "as a new kind of popular hero" by starring him in Two Fyodors. His two masterpieces of the 1960s, however, were panned by the authorities, forcing Khutsiev into something of an artistic silence. In 1978, Khutsiev began teaching film directing master classes at the  VGIK.)

His 1991 film Infinitas won the Alfred Bauer Prize at the 42nd Berlin International Film Festival.

Selected filmography

Honours and awards
 Order of Merit for the Fatherland;
2nd class (29 May 2006)  for outstanding contributions to the development of national cinema and many years of creative activity
3rd class (25 December 2000)  for outstanding contribution to the development of cinema art
4th class (9 April 1996)  for services to the state, many years of fruitful work in the arts and culture
 Order of Honour (5 October 2010)  for outstanding contribution to the development of the domestic art of film and many years of creative activity
 Order of the Badge of Honour (1975)
 Jubilee Medal "In Commemoration of the 100th Anniversary since the Birth of Vladimir Il'ich Lenin" (1970)
 People's Artist of the USSR (1986)
 People's Artist of the RSFSR (1977)
 State Prize of the Russian Federation (7 December 1993)
 Special Prize of the Russian Federation President (12 June 1999)  for outstanding contribution to the development of Russian cinema
 "Golden Aries" award and winner of  The Man Film of the Year  (1995)
 Prize of the city of St. Petersburg  he is a living legend of the national cinema  — V Festival  Viva Cinema of Russia  (1997)
 Moscow Mayor's Award (1999) - a unique contribution to the development of culture in Moscow
 National Award in the field of documentary film and television  laurel branch  for 2002 in the category for contribution to Cinema Chronicle
  Triumph  Award (2004)
 Nika Award in the  honour and dignity  (2006)

References

External links

 Russian Director Marlen Khutsiev Dies at 93

Film directors from Georgia (country)
Soviet film directors
1925 births
2019 deaths
People's Artists of the USSR
Recipients of the Order "For Merit to the Fatherland", 2nd class
Recipients of the Order of Honour (Russia)
People's Artists of the RSFSR
State Prize of the Russian Federation laureates
Recipients of the Nika Award
Gerasimov Institute of Cinematography alumni
Honorary Members of the Russian Academy of Arts
Academicians of the Russian Academy of Cinema Arts and Sciences "Nika"
Academic staff of High Courses for Scriptwriters and Film Directors
Georgian emigrants to Russia
Film people from Tbilisi
Academicians of the National Academy of Motion Picture Arts and Sciences of Russia
Burials in Troyekurovskoye Cemetery